Kachu Sang (also Romanized as Kachū Sang) is a village in Hombarat Rural District, in the Central District of Ardestan County, Isfahan Province, Iran. At the 2006 census, its population was 51, in 25 families.

References 

Populated places in Ardestan County